Petrus Abel 'Piet-Louw' Strauss (born ) is a South African rugby union player for the  in the Currie Cup and the Rugby Challenge. He usually plays as a loosehead prop.

Rugby career

2007–2014 : Youth rugby

Strauss was born in Mossel Bay and earned provincial colours in rugby union as early as primary school level, representing SWD at the 2007 Under-13 Craven Week while at Laerskool Park. At secondary school level, he attended Hoër Landbouskool Oakdale in Riversdale, where he progressed for the first team and captaining his side in 2012, and also represented SWD at all youth levels, playing at the 2010 Under-16 Grant Khomo Week, the 2011 Under-18 Academy Week and the 2012 Under-18 Craven Week.

After finishing school, he moved to Pretoria to join the  academy for the 2013 season.

Perpignan

Western Province

He returned to South Africa after the 2016–17 season in France, and joined the Cape Town-based .

References

South African rugby union players
Living people
1994 births
People from Mossel Bay
Rugby union props
USA Perpignan players
Southern Kings players
Western Province (rugby union) players
Rugby union players from the Western Cape